Derwent Park  is a Rugby League Stadium and former motorcycle speedway in Workington, England situated beside the Cumbrian River Derwent. It is used mostly for rugby league matches and is the home stadium of Workington Town who play in League 1 the 3rd tier of Northern Hemisphere rugby league

Derwent Park has a capacity of 12,000 people with 1,200 seats.

History
The stadium was opened in 1956. The record attendance at Derwent Park was set on 13 March 1965 when 17,741 spectators turned up for a third round Challenge Cup match against Wigan.

The football pitch at Derwent Park is surrounded by a  motorcycle speedway track.

Floodlights were installed in 1990 and were first used on 17 October when Cumbria faced the touring Australians during the 1990 Kangaroo Tour in front of 6,750 fans on a cold night with Australia victorious 42–10 in a dominant display. Derwent also hosted the opening game of the 1994 Kangaroo Tour between Cumbria and Australia on a cold, wet day in front of only 4,227 fans. Australia were again dominant, winning 52–8 (In both 1990 and 1994, the Australian team was composed mainly of the mid-week team and not those who were expected to play Test matches).

Workington Stadium plans 
In February 2019 plans for a new stadium for Workington were announced, this would in involve the demolition of Borough Park and Derwent Park.

In June 2019, it was announced by the new leadership of  Allerdale Borough Council that the new sports stadium would not be built.

International venue

On 19 May 1994 Derwent Park was the host for the rugby union warm-up game between Italy and Ireland before the 1995 Rugby World Cup. Italy defeated Ireland 32–26 in front of 3,000 fans.

Derwent Park held its first full international match on 1 December 2000 with the Aotearoa Māori versus Samoa game in the 2000 Rugby League World Cup. Samoa defeated Aotearoa Māori 21–16 in front of 4,107 fans.

On 14 July 1990 the stadium was host to the "Cumbria Rock Festival" and bands included: Magnum, Saxon, Dogs D'Amour, Wolfsbane, the Almighty and Romeo's Daughter. On 13 July 1991, the second edition of the festival saw appearances by Marillion, Wolfsbane (who replaced Blackfoot on the bill as special guests), the Almighty, Atom Seed, Cheap and Nasty, FM, Jagged Edge, Sweet Addiction, Loud, Lisa Dominique, Dumpy's Rusty Nuts and Rattlesnake Kiss.

2013 Rugby League World Cup

The stadium hosted two matches at Rugby League World Cup 2013: Scotland's ties against Tonga on Tuesday 29 October, watched in front of 7,630, and Italy Sunday 3 November, watched in front of 7,280.

2014 European Cup

As part of the 2014 Rugby League European Cup, Derwent Park hosted the match between Scotland and Wales on 17 October. Scotland won the game 42-18.

On 5 December 2014 it was announced that Workington Town had signed a lucrative sponsorship deal that would see the stadium renamed as the Zebra Claims Stadium for the start of the 2015 season.

2016 Four Nations

As part of the 2016 Rugby League Four Nations, the Zebra Claims Stadium hosted the match between New Zealand and Scotland on 11 November.
The game ended in an 18-18 draw.

Summary

List of Test and International matches played at Derwent Park since its opening in 1956.

Rugby League Tour matches
Derwent Park has also seen the county team Cumberland / Cumbria play host to various international touring teams.

References

Rugby league stadiums in England
Rugby League World Cup stadiums
Defunct speedway venues in England
Rugby union stadiums in England
Multi-purpose stadiums in the United Kingdom
Sports venues in Cumbria
Sports venues completed in 1956
Workington